Garm Khani (also Romanized as Garm Khānī; also known as Garmeh Khānī and Gazmehkhānī) is a village in Itivand-e Jonubi Rural District, Kakavand District, Delfan County, Lorestan Province, Iran. At the 2006 census, its population was 154, in 30 families.

References 

Towns and villages in Delfan County